The 4th Cavalry Division (4-ya Kavaleriiskaya Diviziya) was a cavalry formation of the Russian Imperial Army.

Organization
1st Cavalry Brigade
4th Regiment of Dragoons
4th Uhlan Regiment
2nd Cavalry Brigade
4th Regiment of Hussars
4th Regiment of Cossacks
4th Horse Artillery Division

Commanders
07.27.1875 - хх.хх.1877 - Lieutenant General Krylov, Evgeny Timofeevich
09/15/1877 - хх.хх.1878 - major general (from 16.04.1878 lieutenant general) Arnoldi, Alexander Ivanovich
хх.хх.1878 - after 06/01/1883 - Lieutenant General Pope Afanasopulo, Georgy Ilyich
06/26/1883 - 01/07/1892 - major general (from 30.08.1886 lieutenant general) Strukov, Alexander Petrovich
01/22/1892 - 08/03/1897 - major general (from 30/30/1894 lieutenant general) Timiryazev, Nikolai Arkadyevich
09/12/1897 - 03/02/1899 - Major General Charkovsky, Pyotr Vladimirovich
1899–1901: Georgi Skalon
1901–1903: Vladimir Viktorovich Sakharov
12.24.1903 - 11.21.1906 - Lieutenant General von Bader, Edmund Karlovich
12/06/1906 - 05/01/1910 - Lieutenant General Garnak, Alexander Leontyevich
05/01/1910 - 06/19/1912 - Lieutenant General Vannovsky, Boris Petrovich
06/22/1912 - 10/15/1914 - Lieutenant General Tolpygo, Anton Alexandrovich
10/15/1914 - 04/18/1917 - Lieutenant General Vannovsky, Boris Petrovich (second time)
04/19/1917 - 08/21/1917 - Major General Sveshnikov, Nikolai Lvovich
08.21.1917 - 12.30.1917 - Major General Fedorov, Alexander Ippolitovich

Chiefs of Staff
07.26.1882 - 12.19.1884 - Colonel V.I. Pnevsky
01/07/1885 - 04/28/1888 - Colonel von Essen, Pavel Emelyanovich
05/28/1888 - 03/03/1894 - Colonel von Essen, Pavel Emelyanovich (second)
03/06/1894 - 10/06/1894 - Colonel Karandeyev, Valerian Alexandrovich
06/21/1894 - 12/02/1896 - Colonel Rutkovsky, Pyotr Konstantinovich
1896–1901: Sergei Scheidemann
05/27/1901 - 06/09/1903 - Colonel Zhegachev, Boris Konstantinovich
06/14/1903 - 10/24/1910 - lieutenant colonel (colonel from December 6, 1903) Martynov, Anatoly Ivanovich
12/24/1910 - 06/28/1912 - Colonel Kanshin, Pyotr Pavlovich
07.17.1912 - 04.16.1914 - Colonel Makhov, Mikhail Mikhailovich
04/21/1914 - 01/21/1915 - Colonel Linitsky, Alexander Ivanovich
02/20/1915 - 01/05/1916 - and. D. Lieutenant Colonel Grebenshchikov, Sergey Yakovlevich
01/19/1916 - 07/12/1916 - Colonel Kulzhinsky, Sergey Nikolaevich
08/03/1916 - 10/11/1917 - lieutenant colonel (Colonel from 08/15/1916) Leontiev, Mikhail Evgenievich

Commanders of the 1st Brigade
xx.xxx.1875 - 04.10.1877 - Major General Leontyev, Vladimir Nikolaevich
10.17.1877 - 11.23.1886 - Major General Baron Meyendorf, Nikolai Egorovich
1886 - ??. ??. 1889 - Major General of the Suite Parfyonov, Alexander Demidovich
05/17/1889 - after 01/01/1891 - Major General Aderkas, Vladimir Vladimirovich
02.17.1891-27.01.1895 - Major General A.M. Pilsudsky
03.03.1895 - 01.30.1902 - Major General von Bader, Edmund Karlovich
03/10/1902 - 03/03/1904 - Major General von Kruzenshtern, Nikolai Fedorovich
02/04/1904 - 12/02/1904 - Major General Prince Myshetsky, Pyotr Nikolaevich
12/09/1904 - 12/04/1907 - Major General Savenkov, Fedor Andreevich
12/06/1907 - 12/31/1913 - Major General Krasovsky, Bronislav Ivanovich
12/31/1913 - after 07/10/1916 - Major General Kayander, Evgeny Fedorovich

Commanders of the 2nd Brigade
хх.хх.1875 - after 01/01/1880 - Major General Makarov, Pavel Pavlovich
05/29/1880 - 07/14/1883 - Major General Rebinder, Alexander Maximovich
07.14.1883 - 08.10.1885 - Major General Khrushchev, Pyotr Nikolaevich
08/10/1885 - 07/26/1895 - Major General Baronch, Alexander Antonovich
07.31.1895-19.08.1896 - Major General A.A. Benckendorf
11.13.1896 - 05.29.1897 - Major General Dubensky, Alexander Nikolaevich
06/12/1897 - 04/11/1905 - Major General Gulkovsky, Nikolai Nikolaevich
05/20/1905 - 04/20/1906 - Major General Maynard, Walter Walterovich
04/20/1906 - 10/03/1906 - Major General Vasily Gurko
10/03/1906 - 07/04/1907 - Major General Medvedev, Nikolai Alexandrovich
12/06/1907 - 05/29/1910 - Major General Tolpygo, Anton Alexandrovich
05/29/1910 - 08/01/1913 - Major General Falkovsky, Ivan Amvrosievich
08/30/1913 - 06/06/1915 - Major General Martynov, Anatoly Ivanovich
06/06/1915 - 04/14/1917 - Major General Budberg, Anatoly Alexandrovich
04/14/1917 - 06/27/1917 - Colonel Pulevich, Veniamin Mikhailovich
08/22/1917 - Major General von Krug, Victor Platonovich

Commanders of the Horse Artillery Division
05/06/1895-30.09.1898 - Colonel Shepelev-Voronovich
10.22.1898-21.11.1901 - Colonel L.N. Sukhin
12.24.1901-18.05.1905 - Colonel E. G. Przhedpelsky
06/27/1905 - 07/03/1907 - Colonel von Gillenschmidt, Alexander Fedorovich
07/18/1907 - 05/26/1908 - Colonel Kilhen, Sergey Sergeevich
06/18/1908 - 01/13/1914 - Colonel Zakharchenko, Ivan Alexandrovich
01/13/1914 - 02/22/1916 - Colonel Latukhin, Vladimir Koronatovich
05/04/1916 - 02.24.1917 - Colonel Levitsky, Alexander Alexandrovich
04/28/1917 - Colonel Passek, Vasily Vasilyevich

References

Cavalry divisions of the Russian Empire
Military units and formations disestablished in 1918